Rileys is a British sports bar chain. Once a division of the Riley sporting goods company, it currently is an independent entity with headquarters in Milton Keynes, Buckinghamshire.
At its peak, the chain boasted 165 locations. Historically known as a pool hall operation, it went through several restructurings, with recent marketing efforts emphasizing the sports watching component.

In snooker, the chain has hosted a developmental tournament endorsed by Ronnie O'Sullivan, called Future Stars of Snooker.
In darts, some locations hold amateur qualifiers for the UK Open, a Professional Darts Corporation tournament.
Table tennis is another featured activity, with several locations registered with Table Tennis England's Ping! discovery program.

References

External links
 Official website

Table tennis venues
Sports-themed restaurants
Drinking establishments in the United Kingdom
Companies based in Milton Keynes
Restaurant chains in the United Kingdom